G. N. is the fourth album by Gianna Nannini and was released in 1981.

Track listing
All songs by Gianna Nannini
"Vieni Ragazzo" - 3:46
"Nessuna Direzione" - 3:51
"Bi Bip" - 3:01
"Uò-Uò" - 5:30
"Occhi Aperti" - 3:37
"Autostrada" - 3:56
"Come Un Treno" - 4:26
"Stop" - 3:25

Personnel 
Vocals: Gianna Nannini
Guitar: Tony Soranno
Bass: Claudio Golinelli
Keyboards: Stefano Previsti
Drums: Gianni Dall'Aglio, Francesco Nizza 
Production: Roberto Cacciapaglia

External links
 Gianna Nannini homepage

1981 albums
Gianna Nannini albums